K233CY (94.5 FM, "The City 94.5") is a translator broadcasting the adult album alternative format of the HD2 subcarrier of KBVB. Licensed to Wahpeton, North Dakota, it serves the Fargo-Moorhead metropolitan area. The station is currently owned by James and Brooke Ingstad, through licensee Radio Fargo-Hoorhead, Inc. All the offices and studios are located at 2720 7th Ave South in Fargo, which is where the translator's transmitter is located. The station signed on as "The Loft 94.5" on October 22, 2014 only to rebrand as "The City 94.5" a week later around October 30, 2014 due to a trademark claim from SiriusXM.

Station staff
 Kyle (Mon-Fri 6a-10a)
 Jay Farley (Mon-Fri 10a-3p)
 Cori Jensen (Mon-Fri 3p-7p)

References

External links
The City 94.5

Adult album alternative radio stations in the United States
BVB-HD2
Radio stations established in 2014
2014 establishments in North Dakota
Wahpeton, North Dakota